23 Avenue NW is a major arterial road in south Edmonton. It runs through several neighbourhoods including Mill Woods and The Meadows, and commercial areas including South Edmonton Common, and Mill Woods Town Centre. In September 2011, construction completed of an interchange at the intersection with Calgary Trail & Gateway Boulevard (Highway 2); considered Edmonton's busiest intersection. Because Edmonton has adapted a quadrant system, the suffix NW is sometimes added to addresses, to avoid confusion with addresses south of Quadrant (1) Avenue.

The Capital Line of the LRT ends at Century Park station in the median of 111 Street just north of its intersection with 23 Avenue. There was a proposal to extend the line east along 23 Avenue to Mill Woods Town Centre; however, it was not adopted in favour of the Valley Line, which runs north from Mill Woods Town Centre, and a possible BRT between the two LRT stations.

History
23 Avenue used extend east from south Edmonton into Strathcona County. It was part of a western segment of Secondary Highway 629 between Edmonton city limits and Highway 14, but it was decommissioned as part of the 1982 general annexation. The intersection with Highway 14 was signalised until it was removed as part of the southeast Anthony Henday Drive construction; part of the project included construction of a flyover over Anthony Henday Drive, presently considered part of 34 Avenue. As part of the Tamarack Neighbourhood Area Structure Plan, 23 Avenue will be realigned east of 17 Street and link with the flyover; which currently ends at Tamarack Boulevard.

A western segment of 23 Avenue existed west of the North Saskatchewan River and became Highway 627 when it left Edmonton. It was renamed Maskêkosihk Trail in February 2016 to honour Cree heritage.

Neighbourhoods
List of neighbourhoods 23 Avenue NW runs through, in order from west to east:
Haddow
Terwillegar Towne
Leger
Magrath Heights Area
Hodgson
Blue Quill Estates
Blue Quill
Skyrattler
Ermineskin
Keheewin
Satoo
Meyonohk
Ekota
Meyokumin
Mill Woods Town Centre
Weinlos
Pollard Meadows
Bisset
Daly Grove
Silver Berry
Tamarack

Major intersections
This is a list of major intersections, starting at the west end of 23 Avenue NW.

See also 

 List of avenues in Edmonton
 Transportation in Edmonton

References 

Roads in Edmonton